Vehicle registration plates in Hong Kong are managed by the Transport Department of Hong Kong. The physical number plates are not provided by the government but are made to order by garages. The vehicle registration system in Hong Kong is independent from that of Mainland China and Macau.

Overview
Each vehicle must display two registration plates: one at the front, and one at the rear of the vehicle. The front plate has black characters on a white background, and the rear plate has black characters on a yellow background. The height of the letters and numerals are not less than 8 cm (3.1 in) and not more than 11 cm (4.3 in). The plates should comply with British Standard B.S. 145a, and have permanently marked on the plate the specification number "B.S. AU 145a".

Numbering system

Vehicles of the Chief Executive do not have registration plates. Instead, they have the Emblem of Hong Kong in front and at the rear. During British administration, the vehicle of the Governor bore the St Edward's Crown emblem.

Usual numbers

Regular registrations consist of a two-letter prefix followed by a number between 102 and 9998 (refer to the  Special Registration Marks section for a list of withheld numbers) without leading zeroes. The letters "I", "O" and "Q" are not used in prefixes to avoid ambiguity.

The very first numbers allocated (1–9999) had no prefixes. "HK" and "XX" were the first two prefixes allocated, followed by "AA", "AB", "AC", through to "AZ" – except for "AM", which was reserved for Government vehicles. Then came "BB" through "BZ", "CA" through "CZ", &c. The "BA" prefix wasn't issued, as the authorities came to the conclusion that it could be confused with "AB". "BF" was also skipped, as it was still associated with the expression 'bloody fool' in the 1970s. In 2003, the "BA" and "BF" prefixes were made available at auction for personalised registration plates.

The prefixes "FU", "FV" and "ZM" were also issued out of turn. "FU" and "FV" are typically issued to vehicles whose primary registration is abroad (usually Mainland China), however, some locally-registered vehicles also use the "FU" and "FV" prefixes. ZM-prefixed plates are issued to Macanese-registered vehicles in Hong Kong, and are the equivalent of Chinese cross-border plates. Some "DW", "EW" and "SJ" registration marks are also used for this purpose.

Shortly prior to the handover of Hong Kong on 1 July 1997, the Advanced Detachment of the People's Liberation Army entered Hong Kong.  Their vehicles were assigned a series of AD-prefixed registration plates, but continued to display their Mainland Chinese registrations whilst in Hong Kong.

Some prefixes are reserved and have special meanings.

As of March 2023, the current allocated prefix is YN.

A new scheme will be required following the exhaustion of the current two-letter prefix system when it reaches "ZZ", but it has yet to be announced.

Motorcycles
Formerly, motorcycles used a different set of registration marks. Like the marks for cars, the very first numbers had no prefixes. Later, marks with a single-letter prefix were issued. For example: "B 281", "C 367", &c.

The separate issuance system of registration marks for motorcycles has been discontinued and merged with the main system. Some registered motorcycles still bear the early marks. Hence, a unique registration mark without letter prefix could be found on two different types of vehicles.

Unusual numbers

One-letter prefixes
"A" prefix for ambulances of the Fire Services Department of the government
"F" prefix for fire engines and other vehicles of the Fire Services Department of the government
"T" prefix for use by the motor trade, especially on vehicles that are still unlicensed. These plates are unusual in that they are not specific to any vehicle.  They are red-on-white and usually displayed in a plastic holder attached temporarily to the vehicle by rubber straps. The 'T' is followed by up to five numerals.

Special prefixes
"AM"  is reserved for government vehicles.
"LC" is reserved for Legislative Council vehicles.
"ZG" (for Zhù Gǎng 駐港 which means "stationed in Hong Kong") is for the People's Liberation Army in Hong Kong.  ZG plates are not issued with the standard fonts seen on civilian plates.  The font used is the same as that of Mainland Chinese plates.  However, the plates are still black-on-white in the front and black-on-yellow in the rear.
"ZM" is used for vehicles registered in Macau which are permitted to enter Hong Kong via Hong Kong-Zhuhai-Macao Bridge.
formerly "UC" was reserved for the then Urban Council. Now available to civilian vehicles.
formerly "RC" was reserved for the then Regional Council. Now available to civilian vehicles.
formerly "HA" was reserved for the Hospital Authority.  Now available to civilian vehicles.

Letter suffix
"T" suffix for semi-trailers and have a prefix up to 5 digits.

Letters-only
These are specific car numbers with no numbers, simply letters only
"CJ" for the Chief Justice of the Court of Final Appeal
"CS" for the Chief Secretary for Administration
"FS" for the Financial Secretary
"SJ" for the Secretary for Justice

Other unusual numbers

"VV" non-exclusively for village vehicles; small vehicles on narrow paths where usual vehicles are prohibited. The numerals may have leading zeroes. They are used on Lantau Island and Lamma Island to take provisions from the wharf to the villages. VV stands for "village vehicle".  They are also available to public.
The registration marks used by vehicles of British Army in Hong Kong used the same format as British military vehicles elsewhere: two numbers, then two letters, and two numbers. For example, "15KL44".

Special registration marks
A car number is a special registration mark if
it has no prefix; or
its numerals are any of the following:
(1-digit numbers) 2, 3, 4, 5, 6, 7, 8, 9 (1 is reserved for the Commissioner of Police)
(two repeated digits) 11, 22, 33, 44, 55, 66, 77, 88, 99
(three repeated digits) 111, 222, 333, 444, 555, 666, 777, 888, 999
(four repeated digits) 1111, 2222, 3333, 4444, 5555, 6666, 7777, 8888, 9999
(multiples of 10) 10, 20, 30, 40, 50, 60, 70, 80, 90
(multiples of 100) 100, 200, 300, 400, 500, 600, 700, 800, 900
(multiples of 1000) 1000, 2000, 3000, 4000, 5000, 6000, 7000, 8000, 9000
123, 234, 345, 456, 567, 678, 789
1234, 2345, 3456, 4567, 5678, 6789
(other two digit) 12, 13, 14, 15, 16, 17, 18, 19, 21, 23, 24, 25, 26, 27, 28, 29, 31, 32, 34, 35, 36, 37, 38, 39, 41, 42, 43, 45, 46, 47, 48, 49, 51, 52, 53, 54, 56, 57, 58, 59, 61, 62, 63, 64, 65, 67, 68, 69, 71, 72, 73, 74, 75, 76, 78, 79, 81, 82, 83, 84, 85, 86, 87, 89, 91, 92, 93, 94, 95, 96, 97, 98
(two double digits) 1100, 1122, 1133, 1144, 1155, 1166, 1177, 1188, 1199, 2200, 2211, 2233, 2244, 2255, 2266, 2277, 2288, 2299, 3300, 3311, 3322, 3344, 3355, 3366, 3377, 3388, 3399, 4400, 4411, 4422, 4433, 4455, 4466, 4477, 4488, 4499, 5500, 5511, 5522, 5533, 5544, 5566, 5577, 5588, 5599, 6600, 6611, 6622, 6633, 6644, 6655, 6677, 6688, 6699, 7700, 7711, 7722, 7733, 7744, 7755, 7766, 7788, 7799, 8800, 8811, 8822, 8833, 8844, 8855, 8866, 8877, 8899, 9900, 9911, 9922, 9933, 9944, 9955, 9966, 9977, 9988
(4-digit palindromes) 1001, 1221, 1331, 1441, 1551, 1661, 1771, 1881, 1991, 2002, 2112, 2332, 2442, 2552, 2662, 2772, 2882, 2992, 3003, 3113, 3223, 3443, 3553, 3663, 3773, 3883, 3993, 4004, 4114, 4224, 4334, 4554, 4664, 4774, 4884, 4994, 5005, 5115, 5225, 5335, 5445, 5665, 5775, 5885, 5995, 6006, 6116, 6226, 6336, 6446, 6556, 6776, 6886, 6996, 7007, 7117, 7227, 7337, 7447, 7557, 7667, 7887, 7997, 8008, 8118, 8228, 8338, 8448, 8558, 8668, 8778, 8998, 9009, 9119, 9229, 9339, 9449, 9559, 9669, 9779, 9889
(3-digit palindromes) 101, 121, 131, 141, 151, 161, 171, 181, 191, 202, 212, 232, 242, 252, 262, 272, 282, 292, 303, 313, 323, 343, 353, 363, 373, 383, 393, 404, 414, 424, 434, 454, 464, 474, 484, 494, 505, 515, 525, 535, 545, 565, 575, 585, 595, 606, 616, 626, 636, 646, 656, 676, 686, 696, 707, 717, 727, 737, 747, 757, 767, 787, 797, 808, 818, 828, 838, 848, 858, 868, 878, 998, 909, 919, 929, 939, 949, 959, 969, 979, 989
(repeated two digits) 1010, 1212, 1313, 1414, 1515, 1616, 1717, 1818, 1919, 2020, 2121, 2323, 2424, 2525, 2626, 2727, 2828, 2929, 3030, 3131, 3232, 3434, 3535, 3636, 3737, 3838, 3939, 4040, 4141, 4242, 4343, 4545, 4646, 4747, 4848, 4949, 5050, 5151, 5252, 5353, 5454, 5656, 5757, 5858, 5959, 6060, 6161, 6262, 6363, 6464, 6565, 6767, 6868, 6969, 7070, 7171, 7272, 7373, 7474, 7575, 7676, 7878, 7979, 8080, 8181, 8282, 8383, 8484, 8585, 8686, 8787, 8989, 9090, 9191, 9292, 9393, 9494, 9595, 9696, 9797, 9898

Although unlisted above, some traditional lucky numbers may be reserved, especially numbers that contain 3 or 8, which are pronounced in Cantonese similarly to words that mean "long life" and "prosperity" respectively. For example, 168 is always a reserved number since its pronunciation in Cantonese means "Rich all-time".

Lucky numbers are allocated only after sale by public auction which takes place from time to time. The proceeds of the auction goes to the Government Lotteries Fund to be used for charitable purposes.

Owners of number 1 to 10
The plate "1" is reserved for the Commissioner of Police, while plate numbers '2' to '10' have all been sold at auction. Some of the owners are Hong Kong celebrities. The current owners of number plates 1 to 10 are:
1  :  Commissioner of Police
2  :  Wong Ming Hung (王明雄)
3  :  Cheng Kung Sze (鄭公時)
4  :  Cecil Chao (趙世曾)
5  :  Joseph Lau (劉鑾雄)
6  :  The Hong Kong boss of Amway
7  :  Heung Chik Kau (香植球)
8  :  Law Ting Pong (羅定邦)
9  :  Albert Yeung (楊受成)
10 :  Yung Wing Doi (容永道)

Auction of numbers

From 1973, the Transport Department of the Hong Kong government conducts auctions to sell numbers. Currently, auctions are usually on Saturdays and sometimes on Sundays, and there are about two auctions per month. Numbers sold must be assigned to a car registered in the name of the buyer of the number within 12 months from the date of auction. The car can be an existing car of the buyer, or a car purchased from someone else after the auction, or a brand new car to be purchased after the auction. The Transport Department can advise whether a number has been allocated.

Auction of special registration marks
A special registration mark obtained in an auction is not transferable, that is to say, the number can be used only on vehicles registered under the name of the buyer. Transferring a special registration mark from one vehicle to another is permitted provided that they are both owned by the same person. Sale or transfer of vehicles bearing a special registration mark to someone else would lose that special registration mark. If the buyer is assigned the special registration mark to a vehicle, and later dies, the special registration mark cannot be transferred together with the vehicle to his heirs. Therefore, it is very important to consider in whose name one should buy a special registration mark in an auction. The use of a limited liability company as the buyer gets around the non-transferable restriction because of its perpetual succession and the ability to transfer the company shares.

Reserving numbers for auction
Except with "AM", "LC" or "ZG" prefixes, any unallocated usual numbers may be reserved for auction, provided it has an earlier prefix in the sequence, or the current prefix, or the next immediate prefix. For example, if the current prefix is "LX", then a number with a prefix "AA", "AB", ..."AZ", "BA", ... "LX", or "LY" may be reserved for auction. Numbers having no prefix or a "XX" prefix may also be reserved for auction. It is doubtful whether numbers with the "ZM" prefix may be reserved for auction after the prefix runs to "ZL".
To reserve a non-special registration mark for auction, one needs to pay a deposit of HK$1000. The minimum price for the number is also HK$1000. If the number is successfully bid for by a person other than the person who reserved the number, their deposit is refunded. If no one else bids at the auction, the number is sold to the person who reserved the number, for HK$1000. If it is a special registration mark, there is no deposit to pay, and the minimum price will be set by the Transport Department but will be higher than HK$1000.

Personalised Vehicle Registration Marks Scheme

The Personalised Vehicle Registration Marks Scheme was adopted since 2006 to allow creation of numbers with up to 8 characters (including letters and/or numbers). The letters "I", "O" and "Q" are banned from use in the new scheme, with the former two letters officially recognised as numbers "1" and "0" respectively. Since "I" and "O" look identical to "1" and "0" under the standard font type used on Hong Kong plates, phrases like "SIU SIU" and "I LOVE U" can be printed on the plates, although they are officially recognised as "S1U S1U" and "1 L0VE U", respectively.

The numbers under this scheme are auctioned for a minimum of HK$5000. Although drivers are usually granted their choice of plate, obtaining a unique or easily recognised plate can be very competitive. For example, the registration "1 L0VE U" was sold at a charity auction for HK$1.4 million.  The first PVRMS auction was held on 16 September 2006.

See also
 Vehicle registration plates of China
 Vehicle registration plates of the United Kingdom
 Vehicle registration plates of Macau

References

External links
Transport Department
Auction of vehicle registration marks
Gallery of Hong Kong Vehicle registration plates

Road transport in Hong Kong
Hong Kong
Hong Kong transport-related lists
Governmental auctions